Aunegrenda Chapel is a chapel in Holtålen municipality in Trøndelag county, Norway. It is located in the village of Aunegrenda. It an annex chapel for the Haltdalen parish which is part of the Gauldal prosti (deanery) in the Diocese of Nidaros. The brown, wooden church was built in a long church design in 1952 using plans drawn up by the architectural firm Morgenstierne & Eide. The church seats about 120 people.

See also
List of churches in Nidaros

References

Holtålen
Churches in Trøndelag
Long churches in Norway
Wooden churches in Norway
20th-century Church of Norway church buildings
Churches completed in 1952
1952 establishments in Norway